The Delta is an American dramatic LGBT film directed by Ira Sachs. It premiered at the Toronto International Film Festival on September 9, 1996. The 85 minute film was shot with 16mm film. It won the "Outstanding Emerging Talent" award at Outfest in 1997, and was also nominated for the "Producer's Award" (for producer Margot Bridger) at the 1997 and 1998 Independent Spirit Awards.

Plot
The Delta tells the story of 18-year-old Lincoln Bloom, who, after leading a relatively straight teenage life, is slowly drawn into the LGBT world and discovers he is bisexual. After visiting various shady establishments (including gay bars, video arcades, etc.) and engaging in sexual acts with "men he didn't know," Lincoln meets Minh Nguyen, a Vietnamese immigrant, and travels down river with him in a cabin cruiser. In a doomed relationship, the two bond with each other, Lincoln neglecting to tell his girlfriend and leading two parallel lives.

Cast
 Shayne Gray as Lincoln Bloom
 Thang Chan as Minh Nguyen (John)
 Rachel Zan Huss as Monica Rachel
 Colonious David as Ricky Little
 Charles J. Ingram as David Bloom

Production
The Delta was filmed entirely in Memphis, Tennessee, Sachs's hometown, and includes scenes of Memphis locations.

Reception
The film received mostly positive reviews, with IndieWire calling it the "essence of independent film." Kevin Thomas of the Los Angeles Times called it "...so evocative that it is poetic in its impact." However, it was also criticized by The New York Times and others for leaving viewers with too many questions and moving too abruptly from plotline to plotline.

References

External links

1996 films
1996 drama films
1996 LGBT-related films
American drama films
American LGBT-related films
Films directed by Ira Sachs
1996 independent films
Films set in the United States
Films shot in Tennessee
Gay-related films
Films shot in 16 mm film
1990s English-language films
1990s American films